Habib Hassan Touma (12 December 1934 – 10 August 1998) was a Palestinian composer and ethnomusicologist, born in Nazareth,  who lived and worked for many years in Berlin, Germany. Touma authored a number of books, essays and musicological studies on Arabic; Turkish or Iranian music, among them The Music of the Arabs, first published in 1975 in German and translated into several languages.

He was also a book review editor for the ethnomusicological journal The World of Music, published by the International Institute for Traditional Music in Berlin. Among other studies based on his field work in Arabic countries, he published a description and photographs of the Work Songs of the Gulf Pearl Divers of Bahrain. Another of his studies treated the Arabic musical influence on the Iberian Peninsula during the period of Al-Andalus.

Select bibliography
 The Music of the Arabs, trans. Laurie Schwartz. Portland, Oregon: Amadeus Press. (1996). 
 The Maqam Phenomenon: An Improvisational Technique in the Music of the Middle East (1971)

Compositions
 Maqam Bayati, Palestinian Music Publications.
 Rhapsodie Orientale, Palestinian Music Publications.
 Study #1 (For Flute), Palestinian Music Publications.
 Study #2 Combinations (For Flute), Palestinian Music Publications.
 Taqsim for solo piano, Palestinian Music Publications
 Suite Arabe for solo piano, Palestinian Music Publications

References

Work cited
 Hemetek, Ursula et al. (2014). Music and Minorities from Around the World: Research, Documentation and Interdisciplinary Study. Cambridge Scholars Publishing. 

1934 births
1998 deaths
Ethnomusicologists
People from Nazareth
20th-century composers
20th-century musicologists